The Coral Springs Parkland Fire Department (CSPFD) provides fire protection and emergency medical services to the city of Coral Springs, Florida. With a total of 8 stations, the CSPFD is also has a contract to serve the city of Parkland located just north of Coral Springs. Three of the CSPFD's 8 stations are located within the city of Parkland.

USAR 

The CSPFD is one of 24 departments that make up Florida Task Force 2 which is based in southern Florida. The team is designed to respond to a variety of disasters, including earthquakes, hurricanes, typhoons, storms and tornadoes, floods, dam failures, technological accidents, terrorist activities and hazardous materials releases where victims may be trapped, lost or injured. The Miami Fire Department is the sponsoring agency of the Team, providing administrative staffing and storage. The CSPFD has 18 members of the fire department on the Task Force with specialties ranging from confined space rescue to swift water rescue.

Stations & Apparatus

References

Fire departments in Florida
Coral Springs, Florida